KMDF-LD (channel 22) is a low-power television station licensed to Midland, Texas, United States, serving the Permian Basin area as an affiliate of Antenna TV. It is owned by Gray Television alongside CBS affiliate KOSA-TV (channel 7), MyNetworkTV affiliate KWWT (channel 30), CW+ affiliate KCWO-TV (channel 4) and Telemundo affiliate KTLE-LD (channel 20). The five stations share studios inside the Music City Mall on East 42nd Street in Odessa, with a secondary studio and news bureau in downtown Midland; KTLE-LD's transmitter is located on US 385 just north of downtown Odessa.

Digital channels
The station's digital signal is multiplexed:

References

External links

Low-power television stations in the United States
Cozi TV affiliates
Decades (TV network) affiliates
MDF-LD
Television channels and stations established in 2005
2005 establishments in Texas
Gray Television